The Model 52 mine is a Swedish circular plywood cased anti-tank blast mine. It is in service with the Swedish army. The mine can be fitted with a number of different fuzes and pressure plates including a three pronged plate and a pentagonal pressure spider and a tilt-rod fuze.

Specifications
 Diameter: 345 mm
 Height: 77 mm
 Weight: 8.98 kg
 Explosive content: 7.48 kg of TNT
 Operating pressure: 250 kg or 14.5 kg tilt

References
 Jane's Mines and Mine Clearance 2005-2006
 

Anti-tank mines